Mark Leibowitz (born March19 1976) is an American director and photographer. In addition to winning a Clio Award for digital and social media, Leibowitz's campaigns often receive significant engagement on social media including InStyle’s 2017 Golden Globe Awards “Elevator Gram” and Budweiser’s 2020 Super Bowl.

Leibowitz graduated from Stanford University with a degree in Economics. After a quick stint in business consulting, Leibowitz pursued photography and directing full-time shooting for magazines including Stanford Magazine, Glamour, Conde Nast Traveler, Esquire, GQ and many more. Leibowitz’s fine art Fashion Obscura series originally titled “Backstage at Galliano” received widespread acclaim from The Cut, Elle, WWD, and Vanity Fair.

Leibowitz shot the Rio Olympics and several of the entertainment industry's award shows, festivals, and network television premieres. Most recently, Leibowitz directed ADT’s Super Bowl LIII commercial and HBO’s Game of Thrones Season 8 NYC red carpet premiere.

Leibowitz has photographed stars ranging from Nicole Kidman and Priyanka Chopra to HBO’s Westworld cast to Oprah, David Letterman, Zach Galifinakis and the cast of Queer Eye, Grace and Frankie and the Umbrella Academy for Netflix.

Leibowitz has been featured in several books including American Runway: 75 Years of Fashion and the Front Row and the Well Souled series “a creative collaboration span[ning] more than a decade and includ[ing] Well Souled South Africa, Well Souled Brasil and (now) Well Souled Australia” with writer and creator Mital Shah.

In 2020, Leibowitz directed American rapper and actor Common’s music video for his latest album, "A Beautiful Revolution Part I", directed and shot Entertainment Weekly's digital cover for The Boys Season 2 finale, and won a 2021 Graphis Gold Photography Award for #WearPride shot during the COVID-19 lockdown.

Leibowitz also premiered “The Stereotypes Project”, a multi-year introspective examining “the stereotypes we place on each other, how they affect us, and their internal and external social ramifications.” The project was profiled on British actress and activist Jameela Jamil’s I Weigh platform among several other LGBTQIA outlets including The Pride LA.

Leibowitz is represented by Sarah Laird & Good Company.

References

1976 births
Stanford University alumni
American photographers
Living people